Larginae is a subfamily of insects within the family Largidae, or bordered plant bugs.

Selected Genera
Arhaphe Herrich-Schaeffer, 1850 
Largulus Hussey, 1927 
Largus Hahn, 1831 
Neolargulus Stehlik & Brailovsky, 2011 
Paralargulus Stehlik & Brailovsky, 2011 
Pararhaphe Henry and Froeschner, 1988 
Stenomacra Stål, 1870 
Theraneis Spinola, 1937

References

Largidae